The Capri funicular is a funicular railway on the island of Capri, in the Campania region of Italy. The line connects the Marina Grande on the coast with the Piazza Umberto I in the centre of the island.

The line was built by Von Roll and opened in 1907, being managed by the Società Imprese Capri (SIC). It was rebuilt in 1958, with the old four-wheeled cars replaced by much larger bogie cars, and the haulage equipment also replaced. A further rebuilding in 1991 again replaced the cars and haulage equipment. The line underwent a four-month upgrade in early 2018, with the work including replacement of the winding motors and a remodelling of the two cars, resulting in a 20% increase in capacity. 

The line is now operated by the Società Anonima Imprese Pubbliche e Private Isola di Capri (SIPPIC) and operates every 15 minutes, or more frequently on demand, between 06:30 and 20:30 daily. It has the following parameters:

See also 
 List of funicular railways

References

External links 
 
 Funicular timetable at Capri Tourism web site

Funicular railways in Italy
Railway lines in Campania